Stephen Brislin (born 24 September 1956) is a South African prelate of the Roman Catholic Church. 

He was ordained as a priest on 19 Nov 1983 in the Diocese of Kroonstad, South Africa, and became Bishop of Kroonstad on 28 Jan 2007.

He has served as Archbishop of Cape Town since 2010, and President of the Southern African Catholic Bishops' Conference since 2013.

References

21st-century Roman Catholic archbishops in South Africa
1956 births
Living people
Roman Catholic archbishops of Cape Town
Roman Catholic bishops of Kroonstad
People from Welkom